Lake Pieman is a man-made reservoir created by the damming of the Pieman River, located in the West Coast region of Tasmania, Australia.

It is a long, narrow lake following the line of the Pieman River from Reece Dam back to Rosebery and the Bastyan Dam.

See also

List of reservoirs and dams in Tasmania
List of lakes in Tasmania

References

Further reading
 Tasmania. Hydro-Electric Commission.  (1987) The Pieman River power development. Hydro-Electric Commission, Hobart, Tasmania.

External links
 https://web.archive.org/web/20110319160829/http://www.anra.gov.au/topics/water/availability/tas/basin-pieman-river.html
 http://www.about-australia.com/travel-guides/tasmania/strahan/attractions/natural/lake-pieman/

Pieman
Pieman River Power Development